The Friend to Friend Masonic Memorial is a Gettysburg Battlefield monument depicting the "Armistead-Bingham incident" after Pickett's Charge in which Union Army Captain Henry H. Bingham assisted mortally wounded Confederate Brigadier General Lewis Addison Armistead, both Freemasons.  (It was said that "as he went down he gave a Masonic sign asking for assistance," although this is disputed.)  Although Armistead's sword was captured and later returned in 1906, Armistead entrusted other personal effects (i.e., spurs, watch chain, seal and pocketbook) with Bingham  after Armistead was shot twice.  En route to a Union field hospital on the Spangler Farm, where he would die two days later,  Armistead briefly met Capt. Bingham, and after learning that he was on the staff of General Winfield Scott Hancock, a Freemason as well, he asked Bingham to pass along the items with a message to Hancock (see below).  Having been wounded at about the same time, General Hancock, who was a "valued friend" of Armistead's from before the war, when they served together in the Federal army, would not see Armistead before he died.

The initial record that documented this memorial's depiction had been written by 1870 when James Walker painted the  The Repulse of Longstreet's Assault at the Battle of Gettysburg with "Armistead, mortally wounded, is seated on the grass, and is in the act of giving his watch and spurs to his friend, Captain Bingham."  In 1887, the Lewis A. Armistead marker was placed at the high water mark of the Confederacy. The 1993 film Gettysburg dramatized the meeting (also at the location where Armistead fell): "Tell General Hancock for me that I have done him and you all an injury which I shall regret the longest day I live."

Memorial description
The sculpture depicts Bingham at the side of Armistead and has a plaque on the reverse with information regarding the dedication: "This monument is presented by the Right Worshipful Grand Lodge of Free and Accepted Masons of Pennsylvania and dedicated as a memorial to the Freemasons of the Union and the Confederacy.  Their unique bonds of friendship enabled them to remain a brotherhood undivided, even as they fought in a divided nation, faithfully supporting the respective governments under which they lived."

References

External links
 GNMP website for memorial(s)  (List of Classified Structures)

Gettysburg Battlefield monuments and memorials
Cemetery Hill
Masonic memorials
1993 sculptures
Bronze sculptures in Pennsylvania
Outdoor sculptures in Pennsylvania
1993 establishments in Pennsylvania
Confederate States of America monuments and memorials in Pennsylvania